Allan Henry Spear (June 24, 1937 – October 11, 2008) was an American politician and educator from Minnesota who served almost thirty years in the Minnesota Senate, including nearly a decade as President of the Senate.

Biography
Spear was born to a Jewish family. A graduate of Oberlin College (B.A., 1958), he went on to earn an M.A. and a PhD from Yale University (1960 and 1965 respectively). Decades later, Oberlin would also award him an honorary LL.D. He was first elected to the Minnesota Senate in 1972, representing a liberal Minneapolis district centered on the University of Minnesota. He served a total of 28 years in the senate, retiring in 2000. He was President of the Senate from 1992 to 2000.

Spear served in the Minnesota Senate representing two Senate districts in Minneapolis. From 1972 to 1982, he represented District 57, the southeast part of Minneapolis, including the University of Minnesota main campus. In 1982, he moved to District 59, the southwest part of Minneapolis, (renamed to District 60 after the 1992 redistricting) and was elected Senator from there, and was reelected until his retirement in 2000.

Spear came out on December 9, 1974, and was one of the first openly gay Americans serving in elected office. His coming out drew national attention, being featured in The New York Times amongst others.

1990s and later 
Spear was instrumental in passing the 1993 Minnesota Human Rights Act, which guaranteed protection from discrimination in education, employment, and housing to LGBT Minnesotans. He had been working on this for nearly 20 years, and later called it his "proudest legislative achievement." His personal connections with other senators during his years in office were important in gaining the votes of Republican colleagues. He gained the public support of the leader of the Senate Republicans, Lutheran minister Dean E. Johnson, who gave a speech supporting the bill on the Senate floor (and was later "censured" by his local Republican party officials, and eventually forced out of the Republican party).

In 2008, as part of Minnesota's Sesquicentennial celebration, the Minnesota Historical Society named him as one of the 150 people and groups that helped shape the state. Allan Spear died on October 11, 2008 from complications following heart surgery earlier that week. He was survived by his partner of 26 years, Junjiro Tsuji, who died on March 13, 2019.

He had partially completed an autobiography (Crossing the Barriers ) at his death; a colleague of his in the Minnesota Senate, John Watson Milton, provided an afterword listing the accomplishments of his later years. This book was published in 2010.

References

External links
Biographical entry at the Minnesota Legislative Reference Library
Allan Spear Papers are available for research use at the Minnesota Historical Society.

1937 births
2008 deaths
Gay politicians
LGBT state legislators in Minnesota
LGBT people from Indiana
Presidents of the Minnesota Senate
Democratic Party Minnesota state senators
Oberlin College alumni
People from Michigan City, Indiana
Yale University alumni
Jewish American state legislators in Minnesota
LGBT Jews
Writers from Minnesota
20th-century American politicians
20th-century American Jews
21st-century American Jews
20th-century American LGBT people
21st-century American LGBT people